San Marino Academy, or simply San Marino, is a football club based in the City of San Marino, San Marino, who play in the Italian football league system. The women's team made their debut in the Serie A, the top division of Italian women's football, in 2020–21.

Established in 2004, it is managed by the San Marino Football Federation and is the main representative of San Marino in women's football, as the country currently does not have a national championship or a national team. In men's football, the activity is limited to youth teams up to the under-19s.

History 
Women's football in San Marino began between the end of the 1980s and the beginning of the 1990s, with the activity of two teams: Dogana and Cosmos, both from Serravalle, who enrolled their teams in the Italian women's championships. However, after less than a decade, both ended their activity in women's football due to the significant reduction of female footballers, who mainly "emigrated" to nearby clubs in Emilia-Romagna.

In the 2000s the San Marino Football Federation set itself the goal of enrolling a women's team in the Italian regional championships. In the 2004–05 season, the team of the "Federazione Sammarinese Giuoco Calcio" (San Marino Football Federation) began in the Serie D Emilia-Romagna, led by coach Pier Domenico Cardelli.

In 2006–07, the youth sector was formed, with the formation of an under-13 team. In the same season, Maurizio Eraldo Reggini acquired the role of head coach of the first team, after having been assistant coach in the previous season. The 2007–08 season saw San Marino win the Serie D with 25 wins, two draws and one defeat in the league, obtaining promotion to the Serie C and also reaching the final of the Emilia Cup. In the first season in C, the San Marino Football Federation was unable to stay in the division; they were relegated to the Serie D, before returning to the Serie C having won the 2009–10 Emilia Cup.

In 2013, with the team still in Serie C, Mirco Balacich was appointed head coach. In his third season (2015-2016) he won the double (Serie C and Coppa Emilia), and the team were promoted for the first time to the Serie B. At the same time a Primavera team (under-19) was formed.

In the 2016–17 Serie B, the team finished in seventh place in group B, with Balacich replaced after 10 days by Fabio Baschetti. In the summer of 2017, the San Marino Football Federation decided to create the San Marino Academy, a project launched to manage the youth and women's activity of San Marinese football. In 2017–18, the team finished in fifth place under the new format, and were relegated to the Serie C.

In the summer of 2018, Alain Conte became coach. With him San Marino Academy won group C of the Serie C, and were promoted to the Serie B, which became a single group, defeating Riozzese 2–0 in the promotion play-offs. In 2019–20, they were in third place, behind Lazio, before the championship was suspended by the Italian Football Federation at the beginning of March due to the COVID-19 pandemic. On 25 June, San Marino were promoted to the Serie A for the first time, finishing in second place in the "corrected" ranking, based on a corrective coefficient. San Marino finished their first Serie A season in 11th place, and were relegated back to the Serie B.

Players

Current squad

Managerial history
Below is a list of San Marino Academy from 2004 until the present day.

Honours
Serie C
Winners (2): 2015–16 (Emilia-Romagna), 2018–19 (Group C)
Serie D
Winners (1): 2007–08 (Emilia-Romagna)
Coppa Emilia
Winners (2): 2009–10, 2015–16

See also 
 List of women's football clubs in Italy

References

External links 
  

 
Academy
2004 establishments in San Marino
Association football clubs established in 2004
Football clubs in San Marino
Serie A (women's football) clubs